Sean Rudder (born 13 February 1979) is an Australian former professional rugby league footballer who played in the 1990s and 2000s.

Playing career
Rudder made his first grade debut for Newcastle in Round 17 1998 against Penrith.  Rudder played at five-eighth for the Newcastle Knights in their upset 2001 NRL Grand Final victory over the Parramatta Eels. Having won the 2001 NRL Premiership, the Newcastle side traveled to England to play the 2002 World Club Challenge against Super League champions, the Bradford Bulls. Rudder played at five-eighth in Newcastle's loss.  In 2004, Rudder joined Castleford in the Super League. Castleford finished the 2004 season on the bottom of the table and were relegated.  In 2005, he played for Saint-Estève XIII Catalan before signing with the Catalans Dragons who were admitted to the Super League in 2006.  Rudder played at five-eighth in Catalans inaugural Super League match against Wigan with Catalans winning 38-30.

Rudder later played for Newtown in the NSWRL Premier League.
In round 16 of the 2008 NRL season, Rudder was called into Sydney Roosters side against Canterbury.  He played at five-eighth in the clubs 24-14 victory.

References

External links
Sydney Roosters profile
Rudder takes the next step
Rugby League Project stats
Newtown Jets profile

1979 births
Living people
Australian rugby league players
Castleford Tigers players
Catalans Dragons players
Newcastle Knights players
Newtown Jets NSW Cup players
Rugby league five-eighths
Rugby league locks
Rugby league players from Newcastle, New South Wales
Rugby league second-rows
Sydney Roosters players
Western Suburbs Rosellas players